Table tennis competition has been in the Commonwealth Games since 2002, with singles and doubles events for both men and women. Wheelchair play is an optional event for elite athletes with a disability (EAD) since the inclusion of Para-Sports in 2002.

Editions

Events

All-time medal table
Updated after the 2022 Commonwealth Games
Note: Para Athletes Not Included

Notes

References

External links 
Programme and results of Commonwealth Games at CGF website
ITTF Database

 
Commonwealth Games
Sports at the Commonwealth Games